Sessions is the third solo album from folk rock musician Fred Neil.

Track listing
All tracks composed by Fred Neil, except where noted

"Felicity" – 2:12
"Send Me Somebody to Love" – 3:36 (Percy Mayfield)
"Merry Go Round" – 5:51
"Look Over Yonder" – 8:31
"Fools Are a Long Time Coming" – 5:19 (Herb Metoyer)
"Looks Like Rain" – 7:16
"Roll On Rosie" – 8:25

Personnel
Fred Neil – acoustic guitar, vocals
Bruce Langhorne – acoustic guitar
Eric Glen Hord – acoustic guitar
Pete Childs – acoustic guitar
Cyrus Faryar – acoustic guitar
James E. Bond, Jr. – bass

Production
Nick Venet – producer
Pete Johnson – liner notes

References

Fred Neil albums
Albums produced by Nick Venet
Capitol Records albums
1966 albums